Events from the year 1721 in Denmark.

Incumbents
 Monarch – Frederick IV
 Grand Chancellor – Christian Christophersen Sehested, Ulrik Adolf Holstein

Events

Undated
 The French theater company of the royal court, La troupe du Roi de Danemark is dissolved.

Births
 Anna Magdalena Godiche, publisher (died 1781)

Deaths
 15 March – Louise of Mecklenburg-Güstrow, Queen consort of Denmark (born 1667 in Germany)

References

 
Years of the 18th century in Denmark
Denmark
Denmark
1720s in Denmark